Huali was a car brand of FAW Tianjin, a member of First Automobile Works Group, which specialised in compact vehicles. Huali's first vehicle was a minibus named Dafa (see under products). Huali licensed Daihatsu models from 2003 onwards including the Happy Messenger based on the Daihatsu Move and the Huali Dario based on the Daihatsu Dario (it was later called the Zotye Nomad as well) . All products were sold under the FAW-Jiaxing brand from 2008.

Products 
Huali Dafa
Huali Happy Messenger

References

External links 
Huali Website

FAW Group brands